Agamemnon may refer to:

Mythology
 Agamemnon, one of the most distinguished of the heroes of Greek mythology
 A character based on the Greek hero in Shakespeare's Troilus and Cressida
 Agamemnon (Zeus), an epithet of the Greek god Zeus
 Agamemnon of Cyme in Aeolia

Theater
 Agamemnon (play), the first part of Aeschylus' Greek tragedy, the Oresteia
 Agamemnon (Thomson play), a 1738 play by James Thomson

Fiction
 Agamemnon (Dune), a fictional character in the Legends of Dune series of books
 Agamemnon (Pantheon), a fictional character in the Marvel Comics universe
 Agamemnon Busmalis, a fictional character from the HBO television series Oz
Agamemnon (Seneca)

Music
 "Agamemnon", a song by the Violent Femmes in their album New Times
Agamemnon (opera), an opera by Felix Werder

Ships
 HMS Agamemnon, four ships of the Royal Navy
 USS Agamemnon (ID-3004), a World War I–era vessel that the US Navy used as a troop transport
 Agamemnon class carrier, a fictional space warship in the Gundam Seed universe
 , an early long-distance merchant steamship with a compound engine, so achieving good fuel economy

Other uses
 911 Agamemnon, a Trojan asteroid
 Agamemnon, one of the GWR 3031 Class locomotives that were built for and run on the Great Western Railway between 1891 and 1915
 Agamemnon (insect), a genus of stick insects in subfamily Cladomorphinae